The Triathlon competitions at the 2011 Pan American Games were held on Sunday, October 23 at the API Maritime Terminal in Puerto Vallarta. Both the men's and women's events were held on the same day.

Medal summary

Medal table

Medal events

Schedule
All times are Central Daylight time (UTC-5).

Qualification

There will be a quota of 70 athletes (40 men and 30 women). Each NOC is allowed to enter a maximum of 3 men and 3 women. The hosts Mexico is guaranteed 6 spots, either through qualifying or through a guaranteed host nation place. An athlete does not qualify through this system, rather he/she qualifies a spot for their nation, an athlete may not qualify more than 1 quota spot.

Participating nations

References

 
Events at the 2011 Pan American Games
Pan American Games
2011